Mount Daly is located on the border of Alberta and British Columbia. It was named in 1898 by Charles E. Fay after Charles F. Daly, a geographer. Mount Niles is located two km southwest of Daly.

Geology

Like other mountains in Banff Park, Mount Daly is composed of sedimentary rock laid down during the Precambrian to Jurassic periods. Formed in shallow seas, this sedimentary rock was pushed east and over the top of younger rock during the Laramide orogeny.

Climate

Based on the Köppen climate classification, Mount Daly is located in a subarctic climate with cold, snowy winters, and mild summers.

See also
List of peaks on the Alberta–British Columbia border

References

Daly
Daly
Daly